The 2022 FAS Tri-Nations Series was a three-team association football tournament held at the National Stadium in Kallang, Singapore between 23 and 29 March 2022 for the men's competition and at Jalan Besar Stadium between 4 and 11 April for the women's competition.

The men's tournament was organized by the Football Association of Singapore in conjunction with the Football Association of Malaysia and the Philippine Football Federation as part of the three team's precursor for the third round of the 2023 AFC Asian Cup qualification matches. The three games in the tournament are authorized by FIFA as International “A” Matches. Singapore were the winners of the men's competition, having defeated both Malaysia (2–1) and the Philippines (2–0) in their respective matches.

For the women's competition, Singapore hosted the Seychelles and Papua New Guinea in preparation for the 31st SEA Games.

Host selection
Singapore was selected by the other two football associations of Malaysia and the Philippines as the host of the tournament and was subsequently organised by Football Association of Singapore.

Singapore will host the women's competition as well.

Venue
The proposed venue for the Tri-Nation Series was unveiled to be held at the National Stadium for the men's competition and Jalan Besar Stadium for the women's competition.

Schedule
The men's competition was held from 23 to 29 March 2022 while the women's competition was held from 4 to 11 April 2022.

Squads

Men's competition

The match schedule was confirmed by FAS on 16 March 2022. The opening match, featuring Malaysia and Philippines, was played on 23 March 2022, 20:00 local time at the National Stadium. The hosts, Singapore, took on Malaysia and Philippines on 26 March and 29 March respectively at 20:00 local time.

Participating nations
Three nations participated in the tournament.

FIFA Rankings, as of 10 February 2022

Standings
All times are National Standard Time – UTC+8

Matches

Women's competition

The opening match, featuring Singapore and Seychelles, will be played on 4 April 2022, 20:30 local time at the Jalan Besar Stadium. Seychelles will play Papua New Guinea on 8 April. Singapore will play the final match on 11 April against Papua New Guinea at 20:30 local time.

Participating nations
Three nations participated in the tournament.

FIFA Rankings, as of 25 March 2022

Standings
All times are National Standard Time – UTC+8

Matches

Goalscorers

Men's competition

Women's competition

Broadcasting rights

Aftermath

Men's

Women's

References

2022 in Singaporean football
International association football competitions hosted by Singapore
FAS
International men's association football invitational tournaments
FAS
International women's association football invitational tournaments